The New Zealand national cricket team toured India in  1976-77 season. Three Tests were played, India winning the series 2–0.

Test matches

1st Test

2nd Test

India's first innings is still the highest innings in Test match history that does not feature an individual century by a batsman.

3rd Test

References

External links
 CricketArchive
 Tour page CricInfo
 Record CricInfo
 New Zealand to Pakistan and India 1976-77 at Test Cricket Tours 

1976 in Indian cricket
1976 in New Zealand cricket
Indian cricket seasons from 1970–71 to 1999–2000
International cricket competitions from 1975–76 to 1980
1976-77